Jean-Pierre Worms (16 July 1934 – 12 July 2019) was a French sociologist and former parliamentarian who was active in the associative sector.

He combined the profession of sociologist with political activity which was initially militant but is now mainly associative.

He was elected to the city council of Mâcon (Saône-et-Loire, Burgundy, France) in 1977 and became assistant mayor in charge of economic affairs. He was a member of the Conseil général of Saône-et-Loire for the canton of Mâcon-South from 1989 - 1995. He was active in promoting local economic development and the income guarantee called the revenu minimum d'insertion or RMI).

As a representative of the French parliament to the parliamentary assembly of the Council of Europe, he bore responsibility for the additional protocol to the European Convention of Human Rights defining and protecting the rights of national minorities. He is quoted as saying "Along with decentralisation, it is the thing of which I am proudest during my twelve years in parliament".

He died on 12 July 2019, four days before his 85th birthday.

References

1934 births
2019 deaths
People from Courbevoie
Politicians from Île-de-France
Unified Socialist Party (France) politicians
Socialist Party (France) politicians
Deputies of the 7th National Assembly of the French Fifth Republic
Deputies of the 8th National Assembly of the French Fifth Republic
Deputies of the 9th National Assembly of the French Fifth Republic
French sociologists
French male writers
Chevaliers of the Légion d'honneur
Officers of the Ordre national du Mérite